The Canadian territory of Nunavut holds general elections to its unicameral legislative body, the Legislative Assembly of Nunavut. Nunavut was created 1 April 1999 from part of the Northwest Territories, and its first election was held prior to division on 15 February 1999. Since the adoption of a fixed election date law in 2014, general elections in Nunavut are held in the last Monday of October in the fourth calendar year following the last elections.

Nunavut is divided into nineteen constituencies, each electing one Member of the Legislative Assembly (MLA). The number of constituencies has remained unchanged since the first general election. Nunavut uses consensus government in which there are no political parties. The Premier of Nunavut (and the cabinet) is directly elected by the MLAs, unlike most other provincial or territorial premiers, who are officially appointed by a Lieutenant-Governor or Commissioner on account of their leadership of a majority bloc in the legislature.

In the electoral district of Akulliq, the 2008 election was delayed because of a legal battle that was brought forth by the former Member of Parliament Jack Anawak. Anawak filed as a candidate in the 2008 election but his application was rejected by Elections Nunavut because he had not lived in the territory for twelve consecutive months prior to the election. After Anawak's case was dismissed by the courts, a by-election was held on December 15, 2008. During the 2008 election, only two votes separated incumbent MLA Steve Mapsalak and his main challenger, former Northwest Territories MLA John Ningark. As a result, a judicial recount was conducted, however this resulted in Ningark and Mapsalak each receiving exactly 157 votes, meaning that the election resulted in a tie. A second election took place three months later on March 2, 2009. During the second election, John Ningark beat out his opponent  Steve Mapsalak 193 votes to 179. The 2008 election was also unusual in that one electoral district, South Baffin, saw no candidates nominated in time for the general election. A by-election was scheduled for 3 November 2008, with four candidates.

No people have remained in office through the five general elections that have taken place in Nunavut.

Summary of results
The table below shows the winners of every riding for each election. Full details on any election are linked via the year of the election at the top of the column.

1999–2013

2013–present

Notes
  James Arvaluk resigned his seat in June 2003 after being convicted of assault. He was succeeded in a by-election later that year by Patterk Netser, who retained the seat in the 2004 election.
  Levi Barnabas resigned his seat in August 2000 after being convicted of assault. He was succeeded in a by-election in December 2000 by Rebekah Williams, who lost the seat in the 2004 election to Barnabas.
  Jobie Nutarak died on 23 April 2006. The resulting by-election was held on 16 October 2006 and won by James Arvaluk.
  On 20 August 2008, Evyagotailak stepped down as the MLA. He stated that he wanted to run for the presidency of the Kitikmeot Inuit Association. A by-election was not held.
  On 10 September 2008, Aglukkaq stepped down to run in the 2008 Canadian federal election for the Conservative Party of Canada. A by-election was not held.
  On 22 February 2010, Pauloosie stepped down as the MLA. Although in his resignation letter he did not give a reason, in a subsequent interview with the Canadian Broadcasting Corporation he said that it was "for personal reasons, in part so he could spend more time with his family." A by-election was held 26 April 2010, with Jeannie Ugyuk winning the seat.

References

External links
 Elections Nunavut
 Legislative Assembly of Nunavut

Canadian election timelines
Elections